Kizilto (قىزىلتو يېزىسى, Keziletao ) is a township of Akto County in Xinjiang Uygur Autonomous Region, China. Located in the southeastern part of the county, the township covers an area of 3,882 square kilometers with a population of 9,700 (as of 2015). It has 12 administrative villages under its jurisdiction. Its seat is at Ordolungozu Village .

Name

The name of Kizilto is from Kyrgyz language, meaning "red mountains". This place is named after the red mountain stone on the south side of the Yigzya River. 'Kizil' ('kezile') means 'red' and 'to' ('tao') means 'mountain'. Other nearby places with the word 'kizil' (red) in their names include Kizilsu, Kizil Caves, and Kiziloy.

History
In 1966, Kizilto Commune was established.

In 1967 during the Cultural Revolution, Kizilto Commune was renamed Hongxing Commune ('Red star commune' ).

In 1984, the commune became Kizilto Township.

Geography and resources

Kizilto Township is located to the south of county seat Akto Town and on the eastern slope of Kunlun Mountains, and between 75°02′- 76°41′ east longitude and 38°06′- 38°56′ north latitude. The township is bordered by Kizil Township of Yengisar County (Yingjisha) to the east, by Akdala Ranch and Qarlung Township to the south, by Bulungkol Township to the west, Wuqia Township of Yengisar County to the north. Its maximum distance between east and west is 105 kilometers, and the maximum distance between north and south 75 kilometers. The seat of the township is 98 kilometers away from the county seat of Akto Town. It has a total area of 3,882 square kilometers, including 318.7 hectares of arable land, 86.8 hectares of forest land and 143,000 hectares of grassland. 

The average elevation of the township is 2,200 meters. The northwest is a cold mountain climate with an annual precipitation of 150–200 mm. The southeast is a shallow mountain area, it is a temperate continental arid climate with an average annual temperature of 10.9 ℃ and a frost-free period of 150 days. The main water system in the territory is the Yigzya River. There are precious animals such as snow chicken, yellow sheep and argali, and there are rare plants such as wild snow lotus, codonopsis, angelica, gymnadenia conopsea, cynomorium, daphnia, comfrey and cistanche. Mineral resources include lead, zinc, iron, coal, marble and quartz.

Administrative divisions

The township of Kizilto has 12 villages under its jurisdiction.

12 villages
 Arpalk Village (A'erpaleke, A'erpalekecun) 
 Ejak Village (Aijieke, Aijiekecun) 
 Hongxin Village
 Qapqa Village (قاپقا كەنتى / Kapuka, Kapukacun) 
 Karatash Village (قاراتاش كەنتى; Kalatashi)
 Karatashqimgan Village (Kalatashiqimugan, Kalata Shiqimugancun) 
 Karawul Village (Ka'erwule, Ka'erwulecun) 
 Ordolungozu Village (Wu'erdulongwozi )
 Qimgan Village (Qimugan, Qimugancun) 
 Tam Village (تام كەنتى; Tamu)
 Tampaz Village
 Toyundok Village (Tuoyunduke, Tuoyundukecun) 

 Unincorporated villages  
 Qat

Demographics

, the population of Kizilto was 99.16% Kyrgyz.

Economy
The economy of the township is mainly animal husbandry, and there are more high-quality summer grasses on shallow hillsides and river valleys. It mainly grows food crops such as wheat, corn and highland barley.

References 

Township-level divisions of Akto County